Sid 'Uncle Jamz' Johnson is an American songwriter, producer and personal manager.

He co-wrote Midnight Star's early 1980s ballad "Slow Jam", and The Deele's "Two Occasions" (for which he received a BMI award) with Babyface. He received another BMI award for Field Mob's "Sick of Being Lonely". He was also credited as a co-writer of Mariah Carey's "We Belong Together," which took elements from "Two Occasions." He has co-written, produced or executive produced, Billboard charting singles for Manchild, The Boys, Shalamar, The Mac Band, Dynasty, Renaizzance, Next, Field Mob and Suthern Klick, plus album tracks for Babyface, Midnight Star, Ron Banks of The Dramatics, Usher and Monica, The Whispers and Field Mob, plus the Soul Food (soundtrack). His works have appeared on seven RIAA gold albums, five platinum albums and four multi-platinum albums. He was inducted into the Soul Music Hall of Fame in 2019.

On August 30, 2006, at the BMI Urban Music Awards in the Roseland Ballroom, New York City, Johnson received four awards as a writer and publisher on Mariah Carey's "We Belong Together".

Johnson now heads M.E.C.A.P., an entertainment company that handles songwriting, record production, entertainment consultation and management consultation. He manages: hip-hop acts: Twelve & Dave Deft, KB Da Monsta, Malik Row, DJay Prodigy and Starz Of Da Bizzare; R&B songstress Sasé, ; and singer/acoustic guitarist Damon Karl, singers Kelsi Marie, Nut Bush and Quasey, plus guitarist/singer Starm and rapper/singer
Namandjé; rapper/singer Hampton, and rapper Liq From The Peak (via a partnership with the Hawkins). He also does entertainment consultation for  Additionally he partners with music producers DJGuyWes, E-Bo and Rob Hittz. He has a YouTube Channel for his acts called MECAP Music.

External links
M.E.C.A.P. homepage

Year of birth missing (living people)
Living people
American male songwriters
American record producers